{{Drugbox
| verifiedrevid = 451218082
| IUPAC_name = ''N-benzyl-2,2-dimethyl-propanehydrazide
| image = Pivalylbenzhydrazine.svg
| width = 150px

| tradename =  
| pregnancy_category =  
| legal_status = Rx-only
| routes_of_administration = Oral

| bioavailability =  
| metabolism =  
| elimination_half-life =  
| excretion =

| CAS_number_Ref = 
| CAS_number = 306-19-4
| UNII_Ref = 
| UNII = TK1T520ASG
| ATC_prefix = none
| ATC_suffix =  
| PubChem = 9375
| ChEMBL = 2106941
| ChemSpiderID_Ref = 
| ChemSpiderID = 9007

| C=12 | H=18 | N=2 | O=1 
| StdInChI_Ref = 
| StdInChI = 1S/C12H18N2O/c1-12(2,3)11(15)14-13-9-10-7-5-4-6-8-10/h4-8,13H,9H2,1-3H3,(H,14,15)
| StdInChIKey_Ref = 
| StdInChIKey = FWWDFDMCZLOXQI-UHFFFAOYSA-N
| synonyms = Angorvid, Betamezid, Neomarsilid, Pivazide, Pivhydrazine
}}Pivhydrazine (trade name Tersavid), also known as pivalylbenzhydrazine and pivazide''', is an irreversible and non-selective monoamine oxidase inhibitor (MAOI) of the hydrazine family. It was formerly used as an antidepressant in the 1960s, but has since been discontinued.

See also 
 Hydrazine (antidepressant)

References 

Hydrazides
Monoamine oxidase inhibitors
Withdrawn drugs